Gonbedu (also Romanized as Gonbedūand Gonbadū; also known as Ganbīdū, Gombīdū, and Gonbīdū) is a village in Dasht-e Laleh Rural District, Asir District, Mohr County, Fars Province, Iran. At the 2006 census, its population was 239, in 49 families.

References 

Populated places in Mohr County